Sport in municipality of Lazarevac, Serbia.

Football

 FK Kolubara, Lazarevac
 ZFK LASK, Lazarevac
 FK Polet, Mirosaljci
 FK Turbina, Vreoci
 FK Napredak, Medoševac
 FK Radnicki, Rudovci
 FK Mladost, Čibutkovica
 FK Mladost, Cvetovac
 FK Mladost, Baroševac
 FK Rudar, Zeoke
 FK Šumadija, Mali Crljenci
 FK Šumadija, Šopić
 FK Strmovo, Strmovo
 FK Proleter, Vrbovno
 FK Mladost, Leskovac
 FK Bistrica, Bistrica
 FK Lasta, Lazarevac
 FK Mladi Radnik, Junkovac
 FK Šumadinac, Kruševica
 FK BSK, Brajkovac
 FK Burovo, Burovo
 FK Dimitrije Tucović, Šušnjar
 FK 20. Oktobar, Trbušnica
 FK Sloga, Lukavica
 FK Budućnost, Dudovica
 FK Sloboda, Stubica
 FK Mladi Borac, Županjac
 FK Stepojevac, Stepojevac
 FK Borac, Lazarevac
 OFK Sokolovo, Sokolovo

Basketball
 KK Kolubara LA 2003, Lazarevac
 KK Stepojevac, Stepojevac
 KK Knez Lazar, Lazarevac